Ugnė Šmitaitė (born 10 September 1994) was a Lithuanian footballer who played as a defender and has appeared for the Lithuania women's national team.

Career
Šmitaitė has been capped for the Lithuania national team, appearing for the team during the 2019 FIFA Women's World Cup qualifying cycle.

References

External links
 
 
 

1994 births
Living people
Lithuanian women's footballers
Lithuania women's international footballers
Women's association football defenders
KFF Hajvalia players